"Fallout" is a song by Australian rapper Masked Wolf featuring British rock band Bring Me the Horizon. Produced by Tyron Hapi and Evil Twin and written by Harry Michael, Oliver Sykes, Jordan Fish, Hvdes and Tyron Hapi, the song interpolates the hook of HVDES's earlier song of the same title. It was released on 1 April 2022 through Elektra Records.

Background
On 29 March 2022, Bring Me the Horizon shared a cryptic post onto their TikTok account with the caption "This is the Fallout" while the band were jamming to a snippet of the song in the teaser. Masked Wolf teased on his Instagram page with a glitchy video that would reveal that he would be collaborating with Bring Me the Horizon on a new song called "Fallout" that would be slated to release on 1 April 2022.

Composition
"Fallout" has been described as a nu metal, rap rock and a pop rock song by critics. It runs for three minutes and 14 seconds. Speaking to Metal Hammer about the collaboration, Masked Wolf explained:

Music video
The music video for "Fallout" was released onto YouTube on 11 April 2022.

The video stars Masked Wolf who walks into a room filled with computers. On one of the monitors, Bring Me Horizon's frontman Oli Sykes appears and the two perform the song together.

Personnel
Credits adapted from Tidal.

Musicians
 Harry Michael – lead vocals, composer
 Oliver Sykes – featured vocals, composer

Additional personnel
 Tyron Hapi – producer, composer
 Evil Twin – producer
 Zack Cervini – mixer
 Klaus Hill – mastering engineer
 Jordan Fish – composer
 Hvdes – composer

Charts

References

2022 songs
2022 singles
Masked Wolf songs
Bring Me the Horizon songs
Songs written by Oliver Sykes
Songs written by Masked Wolf
Songs written by Tyron Hapi
Song recordings produced by Tyron Hapi
Elektra Records singles
Rap rock songs
Nu metal songs